Black Mist Scandal (黒い霧事件, kuroi kiri jiken) may refer to:

Black Mist Scandal, a political scandal involving Eisaku Satō
Black Mist Scandal (Japanese baseball), a game-fixing scandal